Philosophy, politics and economics, or politics, philosophy and economics (PPE), is an interdisciplinary undergraduate or postgraduate degree which combines study from three disciplines. The first institution to offer degrees in PPE was the University of Oxford in the 1920s.

This particular course has produced a significant number of notable graduates such as Aung San Suu Kyi, Burmese politician and State Counsellor of Myanmar, Nobel Peace Prize winner; Princess Haya bint Hussein, daughter of the late King Hussein of Jordan; Christopher Hitchens, the British–American author and journalist; Will Self, British author and journalist; Oscar-winning writer and director Florian Henckel von Donnersmarck; Philippa Foot and Michael Dummett, philosophers; Harold Wilson, Edward Heath, David Cameron, Liz Truss and Rishi Sunak, Prime Ministers of the United Kingdom; Hugh Gaitskell, William Hague and Ed Miliband, former Leaders of the Opposition; former Prime Ministers of Pakistan Benazir Bhutto and Imran Khan; and Malcolm Fraser, Bob Hawke and Tony Abbott, former Prime Ministers of Australia. The course received fresh attention in 2017, when Nobel Peace Prize winner Malala Yousafzai earned a place.

In the 1980s, the University of York went on to establish its own PPE degree based upon the Oxford model; King's College London, the University of Warwick, the University of Manchester, and other British universities later followed. According to the BBC, the Oxford PPE "dominate[s] public life" (in the UK). It is now offered at several other leading colleges and universities around the world. More recently Warwick University and King’s College added a new degree under the name of PPL (Politics, Philosophy and Law) with the aim to bring an alternative to the more classical PPE degrees.

In the United States, it is offered by over 50 colleges and universities, including three Ivy League schools – the University of Pennsylvania, Yale University (under the designation Ethics, Politics and Economics), and Dartmouth College -- and a large number of distinguished public universities, including the University of Michigan, the University of North Carolina at Chapel Hill, and the University of Virginia. Harvard University began offering a similar degree in Social Studies in 1960, which combines politics, philosophy, and economics with history and sociology. In 2020, in addition to its undergraduate degree programs in PPE, Virginia Tech joined the Chapman University's Smith Institute as among the first research centers in the world dedicated to interdisciplinary research in PPE. 

Several PPE programs exist in Canada, most notably the first endowed school in the nation – the Frank McKenna School of Philosophy, Politics and Economics at Mount Allison University. In Asia, Tsinghua University, Waseda University, NUS, Tel-Aviv University and Ashoka University are among those that have PPE or similar programs.

History 
Philosophy, politics and economics was established as a degree course at the University of Oxford in the 1920s, as a modern alternative to classics (known as "literae humaniores" or "greats" at Oxford) because it was thought as a more modern alternative for those entering the civil service. It was thus initially known as "modern greats". The first PPE students commenced their course in the autumn of 1921. The regulation by which it was established is Statt. Tit. VI. Sect. 1 C; "the subject of the Honour School of Philosophy, Politics, and Economics shall be the study of the structure, and the philosophical and economic principles, of Modern Society." Initially it was compulsory to study all three subjects for all three years of the course, but in 1970 this requirement was relaxed, and since then students have been able to drop one subject after the first year – most do this, but a minority continue with all three.

During the 1960s some students started to critique the course from a left-wing perspective, culminating in the publication of a pamphlet, The Poverty of PPE, in 1968, written by Trevor Pateman, who argued that it "gives no training in scholarship, only refining to a high degree of perfection the ability to write short dilettantish essays on the basis of very little knowledge: ideal training for the social engineer". The pamphlet advocated incorporating the study of sociology, anthropology and art, and to take on the aim of "assist(ing) the radicalisation and mobilisation of political opinion outside the university". In response, some minor changes were made, with influential leftist writers such as Frantz Fanon and Régis Debray being added to politics reading lists, but the core of the programme remained the same.

Christopher Stray has pointed to the course as one reason for the gradual decline of the study of classics, as classicists in political life began to be edged out by those who had studied the modern greats.

Dario Castiglione and Iain Hampsher-Monk have described the course as being fundamental to the development of political thought in the UK, since it established a connection between politics and philosophy. Previously at Oxford, and for some time subsequently at Cambridge, politics had been taught only as a branch of modern history.

Course material 
The programme is rooted in the view that to understand social phenomena one must approach them from several complementary disciplinary directions and analytical frameworks. In this regard, the study of philosophy is considered important because it both equips students with meta-tools such as the ability to reason rigorously and logically, and facilitates ethical reflection. The study of politics is considered necessary because it acquaints students with the institutions that govern society and help solve collective action problems. Finally, studying economics is seen as vital in the modern world because political decisions often concern economic matters, and government decisions are often influenced by economic events. The vast majority of students at Oxford drop one of the three subjects for the second and third years of their course. Oxford now has more than 600 undergraduates studying the subject, admitting over 200 each year.

Academic opinions 
Oxford PPE graduate Nick Cohen and former tutor Iain McLean consider the course's breadth important to its appeal, especially "because British society values generalists over specialists". Academic and Labour peer Maurice Glasman noted that "PPE combines the status of an elite university degree – PPE is the ultimate form of being good at school – with the stamp of a vocational course. It is perfect training for cabinet membership, and it gives you a view of life". However he also noted that it had an orientation towards consensus politics and technocracy.

Geoffrey Evans, an Oxford fellow in politics and a senior tutor, critiques that the Oxford course's success and consequent over-demand is a self-perpetuating feature of those in front of and behind the scenes in national administration, in stating "all in all, it's how the class system works". In the current economic system he bemoans the unavoidable inequalities besetting admissions and thereby enviable recruitment prospects of successful graduates. The argument itself intended as a paternalistic ethical reflection on how governments and peoples can perpetuate social stratification.

Stewart Wood, a former adviser to Ed Miliband who studied PPE at Oxford in the 1980s and taught politics there in the 1990s and 2000s, acknowledged that the programme has been slow to catch up with contemporary political developments, saying that "it does still feel like a course for people who are going to run the Raj in 1936... In the politics part of PPE, you can go three years without discussing a single contemporary public policy issue". He also stated that the structure of the course gave it a centrist bias, due to the range of material covered: "...most students think, mistakenly, that the only way to do it justice is to take a centre position".

List of offering universities

United Kingdom 

Birkbeck, University of London
Durham University
Goldsmiths, University of London
Keele University
King's College London
Kingston University
Lancaster University
London School of Economics
The Open University
Queen's University Belfast
Royal Holloway, University of London
SOAS University of London
Swansea University
University College London
University of Aberdeen
University of Buckingham
New College of the Humanities at Northeastern
University of East Anglia
University of Edinburgh
University of Essex
University of Exeter
University of the Highlands and Islands
University of Hull
University of Leeds
University of Liverpool
University of Loughborough
University of Manchester
University of Nottingham
University of Oxford
University of Reading
University of Sheffield
University of Southampton
University of Stirling
University of Sussex
University of Warwick
University of Winchester
University of York

Ireland 
National University of Ireland, Maynooth
UCD, National University of Ireland
Trinity College, The University of Dublin

North America

Canada 
Mount Allison University (within the Frank McKenna School of Philosophy, Politics, & Economics)  
Queen's University
The King's University
University of British Columbia (Okanagan Campus)
University of Regina 
University of Western Ontario
Wilfrid Laurier University

United States 

Austin College
Binghamton University (under the designation of "PPL" - replacing economics with law)
Bowling Green State University (under the designation of "PPEL" - with law)
Boyce College
Carnegie Mellon University (under the designation "Ethics, History, and Public Policy", abbreviated "EHPP")
Carroll University
Claremont McKenna College
Criswell College
Dartmouth College (under the modified major of "Politics, Philosophy, and the Economy")
Denison University
Drexel University
Duke University (certificate)
Eastern Oregon University
Emory & Henry College
George Mason University
Georgia State University
Juniata College
The King's College (New York)
La Salle University
Mercer University
Minnesota State University, Mankato
Mount St. Mary's University
Murphy Institute (Tulane University, under the designation "Political Economy")
Northeastern University
Ohio State University
Pomona College
Rutgers University–New Brunswick (certificate)
Seattle Pacific University
Suffolk University
Taylor University
Transylvania University
University of Akron
University of Alabama at Birmingham (as a concentration of an Economics degree) 
The University of Arizona (under the designation "PPEL" - with law)
The University at Buffalo
University of California, Irvine
The University of Iowa (under the designation "Ethics & Public Policy")
The University of Maryland
The University of Michigan (honors program)
University of North Carolina at Chapel Hill (minor)
University of Notre Dame (minor)
University of Pennsylvania
University of Pittsburgh
University of Richmond (under the designation "PPEL" - with law)
University of Rochester
University of Southern California
University of Virginia (under the designation "PPL" - replacing economics with law)
University of Washington Bothell (under the designation "Law, Economics & Public Policy", abbreviated "LEPP")
University of Washington Tacoma
University of Wisconsin Political Economy, Politics and Philosophy (certificate program)
Virginia Tech (offers both a major and a minor in PPE)
Wabash College
Wesleyan University (under the designation "College of Social Studies")
Western Washington University
Wheeling Jesuit University (under the designation "political and economic philosophy")
Xavier University (under the designation "Philosophy, Politics, and the Public", abbreviated "PPP")
Yale University (under the designation "ethics, politics and economics", abbreviated "EP&E")

Africa 
Stellenbosch University
Obafemi Awolowo University, Nigeria
University of Cape Town
University of KwaZulu-Natal
University of South Africa
University of Johannesburg
University of Witwatersrand
Afe Babalola University, Nigeria
University of Pretoria

Oceania 
Australian National University
Deakin University
La Trobe University
University of Adelaide
University of New South Wales
University of Otago
University of Queensland
University of Technology, Sydney
University of Western Australia
University of Wollongong
Victoria University of Wellington
Murdoch University (appears as a unit in Philosophy (BA) or Ethics minor)
Monash University

Continental Europe

Nordic
Bifröst University, Iceland
Lund University, Sweden
Stockholm University, Sweden
Södertörn University, Sweden 
University of Tromsø, Norway

Italy
Ca' Foscari University of Venice, Italy (under the designation of "Philosophy, International Studies and Economics" abbreviated "PISE", more recently “Philosophy, International and Economic Studies”)
Free University of Bolzano, Italy
Libera Università Internazionale degli Studi Sociali Guido Carli, Rome (Italy)
University of Milan, Italy (BA International Politics, Law, and Economics, MA Politics, Philosophy, and Public Affairs )

Iberia
ISCTE - University Institute of Lisbon (Politics, Economy and Society)
Catholic University of Lisbon - Human Sciences university
Charles III University of Madrid, Autonomous University of Madrid, Autonomous University of Barcelona and Pompeu Fabra University (alliance of four universities), Spain
Ramon Llull University, Barcelona, Spain 
Comillas Pontifical University, Madrid (joint degree), Spain
Francisco de Vitoria University, Spain
Universitat Pompeu Fabra, Barcelona, Spain 
University of Navarra, Spain 
University of Deusto, Basque Country, Spain 
IE University, Madrid, Spain (offered together with Law)

Low Countries
UCLouvain, Belgium
Utrecht University, Netherlands (Philosophy, Politics and Economics BSc)
Leiden University, Netherlands
University of Amsterdam, Netherlands under the designation:  PPLE, Politics, Psychology, Law and Economics 
VU Amsterdam, Netherlands, Bachelor's Philosophy, Politics and Economics  at the John Stuart Mill College

Central Europe
CEVRO Institute, Prague, Czech Republic
Charles University, Prague, Czech Republic, BA & MA programs
Central European University, Vienna, Austria
Karlshochschule International University, Germany, offers both a BA in Politics, Philosophy & Economics "PPE" as well as a MA in "Social Transformation: PPE".
University of Vienna, Austria (MA Philosophy and Economics, P&E)
University of Salzburg, Austria
University of Graz, Austria (under the designation of MA "political, economic and legal philosophy" abbreviated "PELP")
Bard College Berlin, Germany (under the designation of BA "Economics, Politics and Social Thought" abbreviated "EPST")
Frankfurt School of Finance & Management, Germany (under the designation of B.Sc. "Management, Philosophy & Economics" abbreviated "MPE")
University of Bayreuth, Germany (Philosophy and Economics, P&E)
University of Hamburg, Germany (under the designation of M.Sc. "politics, economics and philosophy" abbreviated "PEP")
University of Düsseldorf, Germany
Ludwig Maximilian University of Munich, Germany
Witten/Herdecke University (bachelor and master), Germany
University of Zurich, Switzerland (under the designation of MA "economic and political philosophy")
University of Bern, Switzerland (under the designation of MA "political, legal and economic philosophy" abbreviated "PLEP")
University of Lucerne, Switzerland

Others
Ankara University, Turkey(Politics and Economics, still abbreviated as PPE)
University of Bucharest, Romania (Master's degree in Philosophy, Politics and Economics)
National Research University – Higher School of Economics, (Masters in Politics, Economics, Philosophy), Moscow, Russia
Ukrainian Catholic University, Lviv, Ukraine (under the designation "Ethics. Politics. Economics", abbreviated "EPE")
Sciences Po, France
European School of Political and Social Sciences, France

Asia 

Tsinghua University, Beijing, China
Peking University, Beijing, China
Renmin University of China, Beijing, China
Beijing Normal University, Beijing, China
Fudan University, Shanghai, China
Nankai University, Tianjin, China
Wuhan University, Wuhan, China
Zhongnan University of Economics and Law, Wuhan, China
Shandong University, Jinan, China
Inner Mongolia University, Hohhot, China
Seoul National University, S. Korea
Korea University, S. Korea
Sogang University, S. Korea
Hanyang University (under the designation "PPEL" - with law), S. Korea
Hebrew University of Jerusalem, Israel
Tel Aviv University (under the designation "PPEL" - with law), Israel
Open University of Israel, Israel
American University of Armenia, (Minor in Philosophy, Politics, & Economics, abbreviated as PPE), Yerevan, Armenia
Rangsit University, Thailand
Thammasat University, Thailand
Waseda University, Japan
 Yale-NUS, Singapore
National University of Singapore, Singapore
Lucknow University, Lucknow, India
Amity University, Noida, India
Bangalore University, Bangalore, India
Birla Institute of Technology and Science, India
Ashoka University, India
Asian University for Women, Bangladesh

Latin America 
Universidad Torcuato Di Tella (under the designation "Ciencia Sociales, Orientación en Política y Economía"), Argentina
Universidad Metropolitana (under the designation "Estudios Liberales"), Venezuela
Universidad de las Americas (under the designation "Filosofia, Politica, y Economia), Ecuador

See also 
Literae Humaniores
Philosophy and economics
List of University of Oxford people with PPE degrees

References

External links
 PPE, Oxford University – Official Website
 100 years of PPE at Oxford University
 International PPE Conference
 Anomaly, Jonny (29 January 2016). "Why PPE?". American Philosophical Association.
 Beckett, Andy (23 February 2017). "PPE: the Oxford degree that runs Britain". The Guardian.

Further reading
 
 

Academic courses at the University of Oxford
Political economy
Economics education
Philosophy education
Political science education
Subfields of political science